Agrilus horni, the aspen root girdler, is a species of metallic wood-boring beetle in the family Buprestidae. It has been found in North America, including in Arizona, South Dakota, Wisconsin, and Michigan.

References

Further reading

External links

 

horni
Articles created by Qbugbot
Beetles described in 1900